The Canadian Conference of Mennonite Brethren Churches (CCMBC) is a Mennonite Brethren denomination in Canada. It is a member of the Mennonite World Conference and the Evangelical Fellowship of Canada.

Offices of the Canadian Conference of Mennonite Brethren Churches are located in Winnipeg, Manitoba, Calgary, Alberta, and Abbotsford, British Columbia.

History
The Mennonite Brethren church began in Russia as a new expression of Mennonite faith in 1860 after Radical Pietism spread there. The Canadian Conference of Mennonite Brethren Churches (CCMBC) "trace[s] [its] history to several villages in the Molotschna colony in Ukraine."

The Canadian conference incorporated and adopted its current name in 1946. It had previously been a constituent unit of the General Conference of Mennonite Brethren Churches of North America. CCMBC is part of the worldwide community of Mennonite Brethren through its connection with the International Community of Mennonite Brethren.

The mid- to late twentieth century saw significant growth in the conference by means of evangelism. The conference grew from 87 congregations and 14,185 members in 1960 to 125 congregations and 17,025 members by 1970. In the 1980s, it had as many as 190 congregations and 27,277 members. According to a census published in 2018, it would have 237 churches and 34,693 baptized members.

Structure
Every year, the Canadian Conference of Mennonite Brethren Churches hosts an annual general meeting that takes place in conjunction with Gathering (on even years) or study conference (on odd years). Gathering is the biennial national convention where MBs from across Canada gather for worship, fellowship. Study conference, held biennially, is hosted by the Board of Faith and Life and provides opportunities for MBs to interpret scripture and choose a direction together.

Provincial conferences
The CCMBC "is a national body which regulates the membership of area churches, which ... are known as provincial conferences." Local congregations first join their respective provincial conferences, and by virtue of that, become part of the Canadian Conference. Both national and provincial bodies are committed to working together in serving congregations and helping them succeed in growth and mission and are involved in ongoing collaborative dialogue to achieve that. British Columbia, Alberta, Saskatchewan, Manitoba, Ontario and Quebec have separate conferences of MB churches.

MB Seminary
MB Seminary (Mennonite Brethren Biblical Seminary) is the national seminary for the Canadian Conference of Mennonite Brethren Churches. MB Seminary exists to educate and equip men and women to help lead the church in reaching Canada and beyond with the Good News of Jesus Christ. MB Seminary is a Canadian ministry with an international reach, and a Mennonite Brethren ministry with multi-denominational relationships.

MB Seminary partners with multiple institutions in Canada to provide training that is accessible and collaborative. These partnerships include:

 ACTS Seminaries (Langley, British Columbia) 
 Canadian Mennonite University (Winnipeg, Manitoba) 
 Tyndale Seminary (Toronto, Ontario) 
 Horizon College and Seminary (Saskatoon, Saskatchewan)

Colleges and schools
The following schools and colleges are affiliated with the Canadian Conference of MB Churches:
 Bethany College - Hepburn, Saskatchewan
 Canadian Mennonite University (CMU) – Winnipeg, Manitoba
 Columbia Bible College (CBC) – Abbotsford, British Columbia
 École de théologie évangélique de Montréal (ÉTEM) – Montreal, Quebec
 Mennonite Brethren Collegiate Institute (MBCI) – Winnipeg, Manitoba
 Mennonite Educational Institute (MEI) – Abbotsford, British Columbia
 Eden High School – St. Catharines, Ontario

MB Mission
MB Mission is the global mission agency for the MB Conferences in Canada and the US, working with MB churches in discipleship and church planting worldwide.

Camps
The following are Mennonite Brethren affiliated camps across Canada: 
 Campfire Ministries – Black Creek, British Columbia
 Camp Crossroads – Torrance, Ontario
 Camp Evergreen – Sundre, Alberta
 Camp Likely – Likely, British Columbia
 Camp Péniel – Wentworth-Nord, Quebec
 Gardom Lake Bible Camp – Enderby, British Columbia
 Pines Bible Camp – Grand Forks, British Columbia
 Redberry Bible Camp – Waldheim, Saskatchewan
 Simonhouse Bible Camp – Cranberry Portage, Manitoba
 Stillwood Camp and Conference Centre – Lindell Beach, British Columbia
 West Bank Bible Camp – Swift Current, Saskatchewan

Confession of faith
The Mennonite Brethren Church blends aspects of evangelicalism with its historic Anabaptist understanding of Christianity. Mennonite Brethren recognize the teachings and authority of the Bible, emphasize personal salvation, baptize confessed believers in Jesus Christ, and encourage community, discipleship, diversity, peacemaking, and reaching out.

The detailed Mennonite Brethren Confession of Faith lists 18 articles of confession.

Publications
The Mennonite Brethren Herald is published monthly. Le Lien and the Chinese Herald, magazines published bi-monthly, serve the francophone and Chinese communities.

References

Footnotes

Bibliography

Further reading

External links
 
 The Mennonite Brethren Herald
 Canadian Conference of Mennonite Brethren Churches in Global Anabaptist Mennonite Encyclopedia Online (GAMEO)

Mennonite denominations
Mennonitism in Canada
Christian organizations established in 1954
Mennonite Brethren Church
Evangelical denominations in North America
Evangelicalism in Canada
Radical Pietism